A special election was held on June 5, 2001 to elect a member of the United States House of Representatives from  to replace Julian Dixon, who died on December 8, 2000 of a heart attack.

A special open primary election was held on June 1, 2001, of which Democratic Ambassador Diane Watson won nearly a third of the vote in a field of sixteen candidates. She handily defeated her main challenger, Republican Noel Hentschel, in the general election.

Background 
Located mainly in the Culver City area of Los Angeles County, the 32nd district was considered a Democratic stronghold. It voted strongly Democratic in the past few presidential elections, giving Al Gore a lead of 70 percentage points over George W. Bush in the 2000 election.

He never faced serious competition during his tenure, and would serve eleven terms. Before starting his twelfth term, of which he was elected to with 83.5% of the vote, he died in Los Angeles of a heart attack.

Candidates

Democratic Party 
 Kirsten W. Albrecht
 Jules Bagneris, candidate for Los Angeles City Council in 1989
 Tad Daley, author and anti-war activist
 Frank Evans III
 Nate Holden, Los Angeles City Council member (1987–2002) and state senator (1974–1978)
 Wanda James
 Philip A. Lowe
 Kevin Murray, state senator (1999–2005) and state assemblyman (1994–1998)
 Blair H. Taylor
 Leo Terrell, civil rights attorney and political commentator
 Diane Watson, U.S. Ambassador to Micronesia (1999–2000) and state senator (1978–1990, 1994–1998)

Republican Party 
 Mike Cyrus
 Noel Hentschel, philanthropist and candidate for lieutenant governor in 1998
 Mike Schaefer, San Diego City Council member (1965–1971) and financial analyst

Green Party 
 Donna J. Warren, human rights activist

Reform Party 
 Ezola Foster, educator and candidate for U.S. vice president in 2000

Endorsements

Results

Primary

General

References

See also 
 List of special elections to the United States House of Representatives

California 2001 32
California 2001 32
2001 32 Special
California 32 Special
United States House of Representatives 32 Special
United States House of Representatives 2001 32